Mirza Abu Bakr  may refer to;

Abu Bakr Shah
Mirza Abu Bakr Dughlat
Mirza Abu Bakr (Mughal prince) (1837-1857)
Mirza Abu Bakr bin Muhammad Juki, Governor of Balkh who lost his government to Ulugh Beg in 1447